Buford James "Red" Hoggatt (June 9, 1930 – April 25, 2017) was an American college football player and coach. He served as the head football coach at Southwestern Louisiana Institute of Liberal and Technical Learning—now known as the University of Louisiana–Lafayette—from 1958 to 1960, compiling a record of 11–17.

Head coaching record

References

1930 births
2017 deaths
Louisiana Ragin' Cajuns football coaches
Memphis Tigers football coaches
Memphis Tigers football players
Tennessee Wesleyan Bulldogs football players
Southern Miss Golden Eagles football coaches
People from Bogalusa, Louisiana